Jalaran (also Romanized as Jalārān) is a village in Tabas-e Masina Rural District, Gazik District, Darmian County, South Khorasan Province, Iran. At the 2006 census, its population was 62, in 20 families.

References 

Populated places in Darmian County